The Ebenezer Monument is a commemorative monument and marker placed at the corner of 9th and Church Streets, adjacent to the First Baptist Church in Mena, Arkansas. It has concrete panels on each side, three with engravings, and is topped by a pyramidal concrete cap. The monument was placed in 1935 as part of a campaign to galvanize local opposition to the controversial Commonwealth College, which was accused of teaching Communism and other evils. Local opposition contributed to the school's eventual closure in 1940. The monument's name is derived from a Bible verse inscribed on one of the panels: Ebenezer of First Baptist Church/"Hitherto Hath The Lord Helped Us" - I Samuel 7: 12/Sunday, June 14, 1936. The monument contains a time capsule, which is to be opened every 50 years. In 1986 the original time capsule was opened, and its contents replaced by new materials.

The monument was listed on the National Register of Historic Places in 1992.

See also
National Register of Historic Places listings in Polk County, Arkansas

References

Monuments and memorials on the National Register of Historic Places in Arkansas
Buildings and structures in Polk County, Arkansas
National Register of Historic Places in Polk County, Arkansas